Gebel may refer to:

Places
 Gebel Edmonstone, a mesa in Egypt
 Gebel Elba, a peak in Egypt
 Gebel el-Haridi, an archaeological site in Egypt
 Gebel el-Silsila, an archaeological quarry site in Egypt
 Gebel Ramlah, an archaeological site in Egypt
 Ġebel San Pietru, a hill in Malta
 Gebel Tingar, small mountain in Egypt
 Gebel-al-Tarik (Mountain of Tarik), the Arabic name for Gibraltar 
 Tuna el-Gebel, the necropolis of Khmun

Other
 Gebel (surname), Turkish and German surname
 Gebel el-Arak Knife, an ivory and flint knife 
 Gebel Kamil (meteorite)
 Gebel, a fictional character in Bloodstained: Ritual of the Night and its companion game Bloodstained: Curse of the Moon

See also
 Jabal (disambiguation)